Gilchrist may refer to the following places in the U.S. state of Michigan:

 Gilchrist, Allegan County, Michigan
 Gilchrist, Mackinac County, Michigan